Ignacio Viaín (born 9 July 1999) is an Argentine professional footballer who plays as a goalkeeper for Atlanta.

Career
Viaín made the breakthrough into senior football with Atlanta. He made two appearances in Primera B Metropolitana as an eighteen-year-old, featuring in a draw with Fénix on 7 April before playing the full duration again a month later against Tristán Suárez. In February 2021, Viaín was loaned out to Primera C Metropolitana club El Porvenir for the rest of the year. In January 2022, he was instead, loaned out to San Martín de Burzaco.

Career statistics
.

References

External links

1999 births
Living people
Place of birth missing (living people)
Argentine footballers
Association football goalkeepers
Primera B Metropolitana players
Primera C Metropolitana players
Club Atlético Atlanta footballers
El Porvenir footballers
San Martín de Burzaco footballers